Sonny Esslemont (born 29 December 1993) is a Scotland international rugby league footballer who plays as a .

Esslemont previously played for Hull Kingston Rovers, Keighley Cougars and the Hemel Stags, and has also represented Scotland at international level.

Background
Esslemont was born in Kingston upon Hull, Humberside. He has a son called Elliot.

Career
He plays as a back-rower, and was part of Hull Kingston Rovers' first team. He has come through Hull Kingston Rovers' academy, and signed a professional contract in 2012. He made his début for the club in September 2014 against Catalans Dragons.

At the end of the 2015 season, he was released by Hull KR and was signed by Keighley Cougars.

In October and November 2014, Sonny was called up to play for Scotland in their 2014 European Cup campaign. He played in all of Scotland's tournament matches.

In October and November 2015, Sonny played in the 2015 European Cup.

After playing only a handful of matches for the Cougars during the 2016 season, Esslemont left half way through the 2016 season and joined for the Hull-based amateur outfit Bransholme Dales ARLFC.

In January 2018 he joined the Hemel Stags.

Sheffield Eagles
In October 2018 Esslemont joined the Sheffield Eagles on a one-year deal.

Dewsbury Rams
On 21 September 2020 it was reported that Esslemont had signed a 1-year deal with Dewsbury Rams.
On 11 December 2020 it was reported that Esslemont had left the club due to work commitments

References

1993 births
Living people
Dewsbury Rams players
English people of Scottish descent
Hemel Stags players
Hull Kingston Rovers players
Keighley Cougars players
Newcastle Thunder players
Rugby league locks
Rugby league players from Kingston upon Hull
Scotland national rugby league team players